Dávid Tóth (born 21 February 1985) is a Hungarian canoer. He has won a silver medal at the 2012 Summer Olympics in the K-4 1000 m event (with Zoltan Kammerer, Tamás Kulifai, and Dániel Pauman). In June 2015, he competed in the inaugural European Games, for Hungary in canoe sprint, more specifically, Men's K-4 1000m again with Zoltan Kammerer, Tamás Kulifai, and Dániel Pauman.

In 2020, he participated in the Hungarian version of Dancing with the Stars, where he finished in fifth place.

Awards and honours

Orders and special awards
 Order of Merit of Hungary – Knight's Cross (2012)

References

1985 births
Hungarian male canoeists
Living people
Canoeists at the 2012 Summer Olympics
Olympic canoeists of Hungary
Olympic silver medalists for Hungary
Olympic medalists in canoeing
Sportspeople from Székesfehérvár
ICF Canoe Sprint World Championships medalists in kayak
Medalists at the 2012 Summer Olympics
European Games medalists in canoeing
European Games gold medalists for Hungary
Canoeists at the 2015 European Games
21st-century Hungarian people